Minasie Solomon Weldezgi (born 28 May 1982) is an Eritrean footballer who plays for the Eritrean national football team.

References

External links
 

1982 births
Living people
Eritrean footballers
Eritrea international footballers
Association football goalkeepers
Adulis Club players
Eritrean Premier League players